Shades of Gray is the second studio release, and first EP, by Christian alternative rock band the Choir (known as "Youth Choir" at this point), released in 1986. All five songs were later included as bonus tracks on the CD release for Chase the Kangaroo.

Background
Youth Choir was dissatisfied with the results of Voices in Shadows, and during the mixing phase, the band felt that their sound needed something more. Lead singer and guitarist Derri Daugherty was a fan of Romeo Void, which featured a saxophone player who used all sorts of musical effects, and as timing would have it, one of the band's roadies spotted a flyer on Calvary Chapel's bulletin board where a sax player was looking to join a band. That turned out to be Dan Michaels, who joined Youth Choir shortly after auditioning. In addition to the saxophone, Michaels also played the Lyricon, a mouth-controlled electronic wind instrument that provided a moody, ethereal element that would soon be a key component of the Choir's sound. After Voices in Shadows was released in 1985, Youth Choir toured extensively outside of Southern California and even overseas, as the band felt they did not fit the mold of other Calvary Chapel bands that "played gigs in high school cafeterias as a witnessing tool", according to Daugherty. 

A number of changes took place during this period: Broken Records folded in late 1985; in 1986, local promoter and friend Brian Martin became the band's manager after seeing Youth Choir open for Daniel Amos, and Tim Chandler rejoined the band as bass guitarist. On the strength of the re-recorded "A Million Years", Youth Choir signed with Shadow Records, an imprint of Refuge Records, and Martin was able to secure Youth Choir the slot as the primary opening band for Steve Taylor on his tour for On the Fritz.

Recording history
Because the high-profile tour with Steve Taylor was coming up fast, Youth Choir rushed into the studio to record new material. The idea was to produce an EP in time for the tour, then follow up with a full-length album afterwards--unfortunately, delays on the part of Shadow Records kept the EP from being released until after the tour was over. Shades of Gray was recorded at Pakaderm Studios, run by John and Dino Elefante, who by this time were producing Petra's Back to the Street with new lead singer John Schlitt at the same facility. Shades of Gray would be the first release that the band produced themselves, and with this EP, drummer Steve Hindalong took over lyrical responsibilities to become the poetic voice of the Choir moving forward. In addition, Hindalong's work was finally heard on an official studio release for the first time with "15 Doors." Two members of Daniel Amos, Jerry Chamberlain and Rob Watson, contributed vocals and synths, respectively, and Bill Batstone, who co-produced the EP, would continue to work with the band on their next two albums. With Tim Chandler's bass guitar and Dan Michaels' saxophone and Lyricon, the band finally got on tape the musical voice that they had envisioned.

Critical response

Unlike its dismissive reception to Youth Choir’s debut release, CCM Magazine (during its brief run as the retitled Contemporary Christian Magazine) gave high praise to Shades of Gray, calling the EP "musically sustaining and thoughtful." Reviewer Brian Quincy Newcomb wrote that Daugherty's "heartfelt vocals and uniquely arresting guitar sound are driven to new heights of expression" by Hindalong's "propulsive drum attack." Newcomb singled out "15 Doors" as the highlight of the EP, saying that the Good Samaritan message was "driven home with punchy acumen in the memorable refrain."

Retrospective critical reaction also has been highly positive. Mark Allender from AllMusic called Shades of Gray "brooding, melancholy, exciting—this wonderful sound transcends the time of its release." He added that there was "no filler here; all the songs are winners." In a review of the 2000 CD reissue of Voices in Shadows and Shades of Gray, Michial Farmer at The Phantom Tollbooth said that "Fade Into You" [is an] excellent early worship [song], and "All Night Long" may well be the band’s first 'twisted love song.'" In a track-by-track breakdown of the EP, Wayne Myatt from Jesus Freak Hideout also praised these opening and closing songs, calling "Fade Into You" "distinguished" and added that "All Night Long" "has a very catchy rhythm that will recall the listener of Glass Tiger or Yes." Mark Allan Powell in the Encyclopedia of Contemporary Christian Music called Shades of Gray "a marked improvement beyond the earlier full length. All five songs are compelling (and distinctive)."

Track listing
All songs written by Derri Daugherty and Steve Hindalong.

Personnel
Youth Choir
 Derri Daugherty – lead vocals, guitars, acoustic piano
 Steve Hindalong – drums, percussion
 Tim Chandler – bass guitar
 Dan Michaels – saxophone, Lyricon

Guest performers
 Bill Batstone - vocal arrangements, keyboards, background vocals
 Rob Watson - synthesizer (Emulator)
 Jerry Chamberlain - additional vocals

Production
 Derri Daugherty - producer
 Steve Hindalong - producer
 Bill Batstone - co-producer
 Mike Mearue - recording, mixing
 Tim Alderson - art direction, layout
 Nancy French - photography

References
Footnotes

Bibliography

External links
 

The Choir (alternative rock band) albums
1986 EPs